Paul Allender (born 17 November 1970) is a lead guitarist best known for his work with the British extreme metal band Cradle of Filth. He was a longtime member with stints in the band from 1992–1995 and then again from 1999–2014.

Cradle of Filth
He joined the band as the guitarist late 1991, and stayed until late 1994 when he left Cradle of Filth to join The Blood Divine. In 1998 Paul Allender started another band called Primary Slave. In 2000, just before Primary Slave signed a recording contract, he rejoined Cradle of Filth on the band's album, Midian after receiving a call from Dani Filth, along with drummer Adrian Erlandsson and keyboardist Martin Powell.

As of April 2014 Paul Allender has once again left Cradle of Filth.

Playing style
Paul Allender is recognised for his unique right-handed technique and is currently endorsed by PRS Guitars, RotoSound and Blackstar amplification. 

"To tell you the truth... I don't jam. I've always played what actually I see in my head. Therefore, when I play, I don't use any specific scales or anything in order or that's musically correct or anything... I’ve always concentrated on mixing lead-oriented riffs, but in like a rhythmic sense. That's the way I've always been because I've never really been interested in doing ultra-fast lead work. I've always mixed the two up. Just concentrating on the 16th notes and stuff on the right hand, making sure it all sinks in. It's the guitar and it's the way we dress onstage, it's all part of this troupe, this uniformed-like togetherness... It just comes out dark as fuck".

Graphic art
Allender also has an art side project known as "Vomitorium: The Dark Art Of Cindy Frey And Paul Allender". He also produced the artwork for New Project's debut album Ultraviolent Light.

White Empress 
In 2013, Allender was involved with the formation of a new project named "White Empress". In an interview with "The Age of Metal", White Empress vocalist Mary Zimmer (formerly of Luna Mortis), said:   An EP was released in January 2014. Their debut album - Rise of the Empress - was released through Peaceville Records on 29 September 2014. It was initially funded through a Pledge Music campaign. 

In 2016, Allender changed the direction of the project, removing all of the singing and replacing it with narration. The band then had the style of a horror audiobook with cinematic film.  White Empress released the single "Revenant" in 2016, and then went on indefinite hiatus.

References

External links
TD Guitar video

1970 births
Cradle of Filth members
English heavy metal guitarists
Lead guitarists
Living people
People from Colchester